Ardkeen is an eastern suburb of Waterford, Ireland. It contains the University Hospital Waterford, two shopping centres, with various chain stores (Tesco, Next, Homebase) and some restaurants and pubs.

Geography of Waterford (city)